Ficus eospila is a species of sea snail, a marine gastropod mollusk in the family Ficidae, the fig shells.

Description

Distribution

References

Ficidae
Gastropods described in 1807